This is a list of administrators and governors of Zamfara State, Nigeria. Until 1996 the area was part of Sokoto State.

See also
States of Nigeria
List of state governors of Nigeria

References

External links

Zamfara
Governors